Leister Peak is a peak  north of Early Bluff and  south of the Slater Rocks, in the Kohler Range, Marie Byrd Land, Antarctica. 

It was mapped by the United States Geological Survey from surveys and U.S. Navy air photos, 1959–66, and was named by the Advisory Committee on Antarctic Names after Geoffrey L. Leister, a biologist with the United States Antarctic Research Program Marie Byrd Land Survey Party, 1966–67.

References

Mountains of Marie Byrd Land